Hilde Sessak (27 July 1915 – 17 April 2003) was a German actress who appeared in more than ninety film and television series during her career. She appeared in a number of films during the Nazi era including Quax the Crash Pilot (1941).

Selected filmography
 Trouble Backstairs (1935)
 City of Anatol (1936)
 Orders Are Orders (1936)
 The Abduction of the Sabine Women (1936)
 When Women Keep Silent (1937)
 The Coral Princess (1937)
 Water for Canitoga (1939)
 The Curtain Falls (1939)
 Left of the Isar, Right of the Spree (1940)
 Kleider machen Leute (1940)
 A Man Astray (1940)
 Quax the Crash Pilot (1941)
 Alarm (1941)
 Happiness is the Main Thing (1941)
 Luisa Sanfelice (1942)
 Paracelsus (1943)
 A Salzburg Comedy (1943)
 Orient Express (1944)
 Die Feuerzangenbowle (1944)
 Who Drove the Grey Ford? (1950)
 The Woman from Last Night (1950)
 Not Without Gisela (1951)
 When the Evening Bells Ring (1951)
 Story of a Young Couple (1952)
 The Man Between (1953)
 The Confession of Ina Kahr (1954)
 The Angel with the Flaming Sword (1954)
 Sergeant Borck (1955)
 Before God and Man (1955)
 Iron Gustav (1958)
 We Cellar Children (1960)
 Jeder stirbt für sich allein (1962)
 Der Hexer (1964)
 The Hunchback of Soho (1966)
 Long Legs, Long Fingers (1966)
 The Gorilla of Soho (1968)
 Grete Minde (1977)

References

External links

Bibliography 
 

1915 births
2003 deaths
German film actresses
German television actresses
20th-century German actresses
Actresses from Berlin